Paul Miki Nakasone (Japanese: 仲宗根ミキ Nakasone Miki, born November 19, 1963) is a four-star general in the United States Army who serves as the commander of United States Cyber Command. He serves concurrently as the director of the National Security Agency and as chief of the Central Security Service. Nakasone took command of the United States Second Army and Army Cyber Command in October 2016, until the Second Army's inactivation in March 2017. In May 2018, he became head of the National Security Agency, the Central Security Service and the United States Cyber Command.

Early life and education
Born in White Bear Lake, Minnesota. He is the son of Edwin M. Nakasone, a second-generation Japanese American and a retired United States Army colonel who served in the Military Intelligence Service during World War II, and Mary Anne Nakasone (née Costello). His paternal grandparents came from Misato village in the Nakagami District, Okinawa.

Nakasone grew up in White Bear Lake, Minnesota, and attended White Bear High School. He is married to Susan S. Nakasone (née Sternberg), and has four children. Nakasone attended St. John's University, where he received a commission as military intelligence officer in 1986 through the Army Reserve Officers' Training Corps program.  Nakasone also attended the University of Southern California, the National Defense Intelligence College, and the United States Army War College, earning a Master's degree from each institution. He also is a graduate of the United States Army Command and General Staff College.

Military career

Nakasone has commanded at the company, battalion, and brigade levels. He also served in foreign assignments in Iraq, Afghanistan and Korea, and has served as a senior intelligence officer at the battalion, division, and corps levels. Nakasone served on the Joint Chiefs of Staff as Deputy Director for Trans-Regional Policy in 2012 when he was promoted to the rank of brigadier general and previously served as a staff officer for General Keith B. Alexander.

Prior to promotion to lieutenant general in 2016, Nakasone was the deputy commanding general of United States Army Cyber Command and later commander of the Cyber National Mission Force at Cyber Command. Nakasone has twice served as a staff officer for the Joint Chiefs of Staff and was the director of intelligence, J2, for the International Security Assistance Force in Afghanistan. On October 14, 2016, he took command of the United States Second Army and United States Army Cyber Command. Nakasone was also given control of United States Cyber Command's Joint Task Force-ARES, a task-force designed to coordinate electronic counter-terrorist activities against the Islamic State. He served as commander of the Second Army until it was inactivated for the fourth time in its history on March 31, 2017, and continued to serve as commander of United States Army Cyber Command.

In January 2018, it was reported that Nakasone was on the list of potential replacements for outgoing NSA Director Michael S. Rogers. In February 2018, he was nominated for promotion to general. In April 2018, Nakasone was unanimously confirmed by the United States Senate as director of the National Security Agency and head of the United States Cyber Command. He was also promoted to the rank of general. In May 2022, Nakasone was asked to remain as the head of U.S. Cyber Command and the National Security Agency until 2023. In those roles, he has attracted attention for disclosing that the U.S. government took unspecified cyber offensive action against ransomware gangs operating outside the United States that targeted American infrastructure, as well as against Russian targets associated with the invasion of Ukraine.

Awards and decorations

Other awards

References

External links

|-

|-

|-

1963 births
Living people
American people of Okinawan descent
American military personnel of Japanese descent
College of Saint Benedict and Saint John's University alumni
Directors of the National Security Agency
Honorary Officers of the Order of Australia
Military personnel from Minnesota
National Intelligence University alumni
People from Saint Paul, Minnesota
Recipients of the Defense Superior Service Medal
Recipients of the Legion of Merit
United States Army War College alumni
United States Army Command and General Staff College alumni
United States Army generals
University of Southern California alumni